The Battle of Cheoin was a battle between Goryeo and forces of the Mongol Empire in the Korean peninsula on December 16, 1232. Although people in Cheoin had been segregated, they fought and beat the Mongols.

Background
In August 1232, the Mongol Empire started to invade Goryeo for the second time after defeating Gaegyeong and Hanyang. They advanced onto Gwangju in November but lost. Saritai, who was the Mongolian commander, decided to make a detour. He ordered the most of the army to advance to Ganghwado and he continued moving south with the rest of his army until they arrived at Cheoin. Cheoin was one of the Bugok where segregated people were living together and the earthen fortification with about 425 m circumference. Cheoin had a storage of provisions. Sartai got ready to besiege by occupying around Cheoin.

Development
There were about 1,000 refugees and 100 monk soldiers, including Kim Yun-hu. On December 16, 1232, Saritai split and allocated the forces surrounding Cheoin. People in Cheoin decided to fight against the Mongols and nominated Kim Yun-hu as a commander. The Mongol force attacked under the command of Sartai. The Goryeo force that had been waiting on a hill outside of the East gate ambushed the Mongols. Sartai was killed by a missed arrow shot by Kim Yun-hu. As the commander died, the Mongols collapsed and the Goryeo force defeated the Mongols completely.

Aftermath
The Mongol Empire was shocked by Saritai's death. Although the war had been favorable for the Mongols, the war turned in Goryeo's favor. The Mongol Empire concluded a peace treaty with Goryeo and withdrew its troops. The Goryeo government promoted Kim Yun-hu's position in admiration of his achievement, but Kim declined. Cheoin bugok was promoted to Hyeon.

References

Sieges involving Korea
Battles involving the Mongol Empire
1232 in Asia
Conflicts in 1232
1232 in the Mongol Empire